The following is a list of conflicts involving the Quds Force, part of Iran's Islamic Revolutionary Guard Corps (IRGC). The unit is a special force responsible for extraterritorial operations.

Wars 
 Iran–Iraq War
 1982 Lebanon War (1982)
 South Lebanon conflict (1985–2000)
 Bosnian War 
 War in Afghanistan (2001)
 Iraq War (2003–2011)
 Lebanon War (2006)
 Gaza–Israel conflict (2006–present)
 Syrian Civil War (2011–present)
 Iranian support for Syria in the Syrian Civil War
 Military intervention against the Islamic State of Iraq and the Levant
 Iranian intervention in Iraq (2014–present)
 2015 military intervention in Yemen (alleged)

Battles

References 

Military operations involving Quds Force